Alsinidendron trinerve, also called three nerved alsinidendron, is a species of flowering plant in the family Caryophyllaceae, that is endemic to island of Oahu in Hawaii.

Associated plants include pilo (Coprosma spp.), apeape (Gunnera petaloidea), alani (Melicope spp.), hāpuu (Cibotium spp.), hame (Antidesma platyphyllum), and māmaki (Pipturus albidus). It is threatened by habitat loss.

References

Caryophyllaceae
Endemic flora of Hawaii
Critically endangered plants
Taxonomy articles created by Polbot